Acalolepta sublusca is a species of beetle in the family Cerambycidae. It was described by James Thomson in 1857, originally under the genus Monochamus. It is known from Malaysia, China, Singapore, Japan, Laos, Taiwan, Cambodia, and Vietnam.

Subspecies
 Acalolepta sublusca maculihumera (Matsushita, 1933)
 Acalolepta sublusca sublusca (Thomson, 1857)

References

Acalolepta
Beetles described in 1857